Grace Presbyterian Church is a Protestant congregation located in Peoria, Illinois.  The church's 1,700 members are currently affiliated with the Presbyterian Church in America.

History 
Initially called the Fourth Ward Mission School, Grace Presbyterian was founded in 1862 as a Sunday School for area youth. It was associated with the Old School Presbyterian Church, which identified with Calvinist Orthodoxy and emphasized education over revivalism. The school was sponsored by the former First Presbyterian Church of Peoria as part of its "sabbath school" movement.

D.W. McWilliams, the first superintendent, was a prominent railroad man who had relocated from New York to Peoria.  He was able to secure a passenger rail coach to use as a meeting place. The school started with 19 children.

In 1868, the group was able to organize as a church, which was a goal of the school's founding.  Originally just called Grace Church, it was renamed Grace Presbyterian Church in 1883.

The Church's first permanent location, at Wayne Street and Madison Avenue, was a wooden structure built in 1873. It was destroyed by fire in 1890 and replaced by a brick structure at the same location.  

The church faced great financial difficulty during the Great Depression.  As resources dwindled, the question of closing was put to the congregation - but members voted to carry on.  

In 1957, the church moved to the corner of Knoxville Ave. and Forrest Hill Ave.  In 1973 a larger sanctuary was added.   

The church experienced large and sustained growth throughout the 1960s, 70s and 80s. The church attracted several from other Protestant congregations, sometimes due to concerns regarding the World Council of Churches.  It was during this time that Grace's Sunday sermon was carried on over 150 broadcast stations across the United States, Canada, Latin America and Africa.

In 1981, the church voted unanimously to disaffiliate with the United Presbyterian Church in the United States of America. A congenial departure agreement allowed Grace Presbyterian to leave the denominational alliance without sacrificing property ownership rights. In 1982, after exploring several options, the church Session voted to join the Presbyterian Church in America.

Education and Sunday School continue to be an important focus of the church, which moved to its current 60 acre campus in 2010.

Route 91 church
According to the executive director the previous church structure was out-dated and ill-suited for the church's growing slate of programs.   Congregants who parked in an overflow lot were forced to cross a busy intersection in order to worship.

In 2010, under the leadership of Ben Johnston, the church built a new 110,000 square foot facility - containing worship space, classrooms, recreational and administrative areas. Based on five years of planning and discussion, the auditorium style worship center features theater seating and studio quality lighting.

Once known for its conservative and orderly mode of Protestant worship, the congregation retained some traditional elements from the former building. The DeCou organ and the chapel stained glass, for example, were transferred from the previous building.

The 1,352-seat sanctuary is situated within a 60-acre campus on Peoria's far northwest side. Peoria's NBC affiliate (WEEK TV-25) continues to broadcast Sunday morning worship as they have since 1974.

Leadership

Complete list of Ministers

Doctrine 
Grace Presbyterian adheres to the Westminster Confession of Faith, subordinate to the Bible.  The church emphasizes the following doctrines:

The Bible is the written word of God, inspired by the Holy Spirit and without error in the original manuscript
The Holy Trinity
The sinfulness and hopelessness of mankind in its natural state
The graciousness and faithfulness of God towards his people
Salvation comes from God alone as he sovereignly chooses those He will save
The Holy Spirit indwells God's people to give them strength and wisdom
Jesus is the eternal Son of God
All aspects of life are for the Glory of God under the leadership of Jesus
Jesus will return bodily and visibly, to judge all mankind and to receive His people to Himself

References

External links
Grace Presbyterian Church

Presbyterian Church in America churches in Illinois
Presbyterian churches in Illinois
Churches in Peoria, Illinois
Religious organizations established in 1862
1862 establishments in Illinois